Liverpool city centre is the commercial, cultural, financial and historical centre of Liverpool, England.

The inner city districts of Vauxhall, Everton, Edge Hill, Kensington and Toxteth mark the border with Liverpool city centre which consists of the L1, L2 and L3 postal districts. The population of the city centre has grown dramatically to around 36,000.

Liverpool was granted borough status in 1207, and the original seven streets of the settlement can now be found within the commercial district of Liverpool city centre. Many of Liverpool's most famous landmarks are located in the city centre and in 2006 Liverpool was visited by 625,000 international visitors alone, making it the fourth most visited city in the United Kingdom. Six areas within Liverpool city Centre form the Liverpool Maritime Mercantile City which is a former UNESCO designated World Heritage Site.

Liverpool city centre is one of the most architecturally significant locations in the country. Examples of architecture in Liverpool city centre include Liverpool Cathedral, St. George's Hall, the Royal Liver Building, Oriel Chambers, the world's first metal framed glass curtain walled building, and West Tower.

Map

Areas

Areas within Liverpool city centre are distinctive areas that define the centre of Liverpool, which are not to be confused with trendy and modern business terms and definitions.

Baltic Triangle
The Baltic Triangle was originally defined as the area as being bounded by Liver Street, Park Lane, Parliament Street and Chaloner Street / Wapping but has since been expanded by the council to cover include the Dock Road, Sefton Street and Brunswick Station. It is believed to have got its name from the number of timber warehouses and yards used for storing timber from the Baltic countries in the 1800s.

The area is home to a growing number of creative and digital businesses, which sit alongside a range of independent food and drink traders and has seen extensive development over the last 10 years and has been the subject of a Spatial Regeneration Framework (SRF) to guide the future development.

Canning
Canning is an alternative name for the elegant and mainly Georgian collection of terraced streets at the edge of the city centre, often referred to as the "Georgian Quarter".

Cavern Quarter
Including the Mathew Street area.

Central Retail Area
Centred on Church Street and Lord Street, this area contains many shops and restaurants.

Chinatown
The Chinatown in Liverpool city centre is home to the oldest Chinese community in Europe, dating back to the 19th century. Chinese are now the largest visible ethnic minority group in the city numbering up to 30,000. Numerous Chinese-owned supermarkets, restaurants and community groups are spread across Liverpool's Chinatown. The Liverpool Chinese Gospel Church and the Liverpool Chinese Christian Disciples Church are also located within the area. The arch located at the gateway to Chinatown, Liverpool is also the largest of its kind outside of China.

Commercial District

Liverpool's "commercial district" is a term given by business to distinguish Liverpool's business and commercial centre from the rest of the city centre.

It is centred on Old Hall Street and is the financial heart of Liverpool. Many businesses and companies have a strong presence in the area. Since the mid-2000s many new building and redevelopment projects have taken place in the commercial district, which is now home to some of the tallest buildings in North West England. Some notable properties within the commercial district include the headquarters of the Post & Echo and offices of Unisys, HM Passport Office, BT and Maersk Line. With  of floor space, New Hall Place is the largest office building in Liverpool, The Plaza is another large office building in the commercial district which is occupied by a number of different companies. The table below shows the tallest buildings within the commercial district (excluding buildings in neighbouring Prince's Dock or Pier Head – a more detailed list of the tallest buildings and structures in the remainder of Liverpool city centre can be seen here).

Cultural Quarter
William Brown Street
William Brown Street is adjacent to St George's Hall and St John's Garden, close to Lime Street Station. It is a short pedestrianised street featuring several significant buildings constructed in the latter half of the 19th century. The Library and Museum was designed by John Weightman (1857–60), to its east the Walker Art Gallery and Picton Reading Room built in the 1870s, the County Sessions House built in the 1890s. In front of them stands the Nelson Column, erected 1861–1863.

Hope Street
Hope Street and its immediate vicinity is notable for a number of reasons. The street connects Liverpool's two cathedrals  Liverpool Cathedral and Liverpool Metropolitan Cathedral, as well as being home to a large part of the University of Liverpool's main campus. Other sites of interest on or near Hope Street include the Everyman Theatre, Unity Theatre and Liverpool Philharmonic Hall.

Islington

A district on the eastern edge of Liverpool City Centre including the streets bounded by New Islington, London Road, Pembroke Place and Moss Street. A 15-year masterplan has been created for the area with plans to transform up to 1.5m square metres of land with hotels, offices, high-quality student accommodation and new homes for 'key workers' such as nurses and doctors.

Knowledge Quarter
 "Knowledge Quarter"

Liverpool One
 Liverpool One
Opened in 2008, composed of retail units, this is the new shopping area near to Church Street and Lord Street.

Ropewalks
 RopeWalks
Independent shops, clubs, restaurants and bars.

Pride Quarter

Home to the Liverpool Gay Quarter around Stanley Street.

Waterfront

Kings Dock
Kings Dock has been vastly redeveloped over recent years, and the former dock has now been filled in. The 11,000 capacity Echo Arena is now sited on what was King's Dock as well as a number of new apartment buildings and hotels.

Pier Head and Mann Island

Pier Head is one of Liverpool's most famous locations, it is home to the 'Three Graces' which have dominated the city's skyline for over a century (they are the Royal Liver Building, the Cunard Building and the Port of Liverpool Building). The Three Graces are not the only buildings located at Pier Head, the Memorial to the Engine Room Heroes of the Titanic is also sited here alongside the Pier Head Ferry Terminal and Queensway Tunnel Ventilation Shaft. Pier Head is bordered to the north by Prince's Dock and to the south by Mann Island. Mann Island is another section of the Liverpool waterfront which has seen significant regeneration over recent years, the Museum of Liverpool and the Mann Island Buildings are both under-construction as of September 2010.

Prince's Dock
The Prince's Dock is located to the north of the Pier Head and the Three Graces which is now the home of the Liverpool Cruise Terminal where turnaround cruises arrive and depart. The land surrounding Prince's Dock is the subject of major redevelopment and could be part of the very ambitious Liverpool Waters Scheme.

Architecture

RIBA North and their public gallery are situated on Mann Island.

Culture

In 2008 Liverpool was the European Capital of Culture, the first city in England to be awarded the title. The cultural history of the city was celebrated throughout the year and Liverpool city centre saw an influx of tourists to its museums, art galleries and visitor attractions in general. 2008 also saw large scale regeneration with the completion of numerous skyscrapers in the Commercial District as well as the opening of Liverpool One and the Liverpool Arena. There are numerous music venues throughout the city, the largest being the Liverpool Arena which has held host to many of the world's top musical acts as well as the MTV Europe Music Awards 2008 and the MOBO Awards 2010.

Liverpool city centre has a significant number of museums and art galleries, many being owned by National Museums Liverpool. World Museum Liverpool is the largest and most diverse of the museums and can be found on William Brown Street, adjacent to the World Museum is the William Brown Library and Museum and Walker Art Gallery. The Merseyside Maritime Museum, International Slavery Museum and Tate Liverpool are all located within the Albert Dock complex. Nearby is Museum of Liverpool. Other museums located within Liverpool city centre include the British Music Experience and Open Eye Gallery both at Pier Head.

Nightlife

Liverpool city centre is noted for its vibrant and diverse nightlife. There are a number of  different areas within the city centre that include large concentrations of bars, pubs and nightclubs. They include: Albert Dock / Water Street, Concert Square, the Pride (Gay/Stanley Street) Quarter, Hardman Street/ Hope Street and Mathew Street.

Numerous exclusive bars can be found around the Albert Dock and Pier Head, whilst Concert Square, a popular destination for students and young adults, contains no fewer than thirty of the city's largest nightclubs. The Cavern Club, which was made famous by The Beatles, is situated in the 'Cavern Quarter' in and around Mathew Street. A large number of LGBT-friendly bars can be found in the Stanley Street Quarter, which was officially recognised as the city's 'Gay Quarter' in 2011. The clubbing mecca that was Nation (home of the Cream brand) was also a popular nightclub in Liverpool city centre. Amongst Liverpool's most famous nightclubs are Alma de Cuba, Baa Bar, BamBooo, Hope & Anchor, Igloo, Koco, Korova, The Krazyhouse, Le Bateau, Popworld, The Magnet, Passion, Walkabout and Zanzibar.

Retail

The retail industry is a vital component in the economy of Liverpool city centre, and in 2009 Liverpool ranked nationally as the fifth most popular retail destination. Liverpool's main shopping area consists of numerous streets and shopping centres. Amongst the larger predominantly retail orientated streets in Liverpool city centre are Church Street, Lord Street, Bold Street and Mathew Street. Liverpool One opened fully in October 2008 being the redevelopment of a large part of the postcode area L1—hence the name. It is also partly built on the old Chavasse Park, but much of the park still remains. Previous to the opening of the Liverpool One complex, St. John's Shopping Centre was the largest shopping centre in Liverpool, it still remains the largest covered shopping centre in the city. 

Clayton Square Shopping Centre is also located in the very centre of the city as is Metquarter, an upmarket shopping centre consisting primarily of boutique stores (such as Armani Exchange, Diesel, Flannels, Hugo Boss and Tommy Hilfiger), it opened in 2006. Another ambitious retail project for Liverpool city centre was also approved for construction in 2010, Central Village will be built around Liverpool Central station and Lewis's Department Store. Liverpool One is anchored by two large John Lewis and Debenhams stores alongside the largest Topshop outside London. In 2011 Liverpool City Centre was ranked as the second most attractive retail destination. More recently, notable additions to Liverpool's retail sector include the flagship Forever 21 store on Whitechapel, opposite the large store owned by handmade cosmetics company Lush.

Transport

History
Five stations on the Liverpool Overhead Railway were in Liverpool city centre (Pier Head connecting to Liverpool Tramways Company main hub, James St, Customs House/Canning and Wapping Dock) from 1893 until the line's closure in 1956. On what is now the Northern Line, Liverpool St James railway station was also open until 1917 and Crown Street railway station until 1972. Liverpool Exchange was replaced by Moorfields.

Present
Liverpool Lime Street railway station, the mainline railway terminus in Liverpool city centre, provides direct connections to many points in Great Britain.  Liverpool is home to a hybrid commuter rail S-train network with all four city centre stations underground.
Liverpool Central railway station
Moorfields railway station
Liverpool James Street railway station
Liverpool Lime Street railway station
Liverpool Central station and Moorfields station have platforms that serve both the Merseyrail Northern and Wirral Lines, while Lime Street underground and James Street station are located on the Wirral Line. The Lime Street mainline station also provides local services on the Merseyrail City Line.

Over three and a quarter miles of disused rail tunnels lie under the city centre, Wapping Tunnel and Waterloo Tunnel/Victoria Tunnel.

Numerous A roads lead into Liverpool city centre including the A5036, A5047, A5052, A5053, A562, A565, A580 and the A59. The Kingsway Tunnel and Queensway Tunnel, which are both toll roads, run under the River Mersey connecting Liverpool city centre to Wallasey and Birkenhead respectively.

There are numerous bus stops and stations across Liverpool city centre, however the main interchanges are Queen Square bus station and Liverpool One bus station which are managed by Merseytravel, and are served primarily by Arriva North West and Stagecoach Merseyside. There are services to all corners of the city and as far afield as Chester and Preston. National Express coaches serve further.

City sights and City Explorer by Maghull Coaches offer open top tour of the city by double decker bus.

National Cycle Route 56 and National Cycle Route 810 passes through Liverpool city centre.

The only major forms of transport not readily available in Liverpool city centre are via trams and air, although trains and buses link Liverpool city centre to Liverpool John Lennon Airport in Speke.

Water Transport

Isle of Man Steam Packet Company operate out of the Port of Liverpool which is within the city centre adjacent to the River Mersey running daily ferry services to the Isle of Man during summertime. No services to Ireland operate directly from Liverpool city centre since Dublin and Belfast routes stopped in 2010 except from nearby Bootle for P&O Ferries to Dublin and Birkenhead for Stena Line to Belfast.

The Mersey Ferry operates between the Pier Head and the Wirral.

Leeds and Liverpool Canal runs into Liverpool city centre via Liverpool Canal Link at Pier Head since 2009.

Liverpool Cruise Terminal in the city centre provides long-distance passenger cruises, Fred. Olsen Cruise Lines MS Black Watch and Cruise & Maritime Voyages MS Magellan using the terminal to depart to Iceland, France, Spain and Norway.

Universities
Two of Liverpool's three universities are located within Liverpool city centre – the University of Liverpool and Liverpool John Moores University. Combined they have a student population of over 45,000. The University of Liverpool is largely sited around Mount Pleasant, some of the buildings possessed by the University of Liverpool in Liverpool city centre include the Harold Cohen Library, the Liverpool School of Tropical Medicine, the Liverpool Guild of Students and the Victoria Building. Liverpool John Moores University has two campuses in Liverpool city centre, one at Byrom Street and one at Mount Pleasant also. The Liverpool Business School, Liverpool College of Art and Liverpool Students' Union are all part of LJMU.

References

External links

Liverpool
City Centre